Demna is a Georgian masculine given name. Notable people with the name include:

Demna of Georgia (died c. 1178), Georgian royal prince
Demna Gvasalia (b. 1981), Georgian fashion designer

Georgian masculine given names